Gillichthys is a genus of gobies native to the coasts of Baja California and southern California.

Etymology
"Gillichthys" literally means "Gill's fish".  It was named in honor of the ichthyologist Theodore Gill.

Species
There are currently three recognized species in this genus:
 Gillichthys detrusus Gilbert & Scofield, 1898 (Delta mudsucker)
 Gillichthys mirabilis J. G. Cooper, 1864 (Longjaw mudsucker)
 Gillichthys seta (Ginsburg, 1938) (Shortjaw mudsucker)

References

 
Gobionellinae
Taxa named by James Graham Cooper